Arkatech Beatz (formerly known as The Infinite Arkatechz) are a music production team from New York City, now based in Atlanta. They were affiliated with Loud Records/Sony Music Entertainment as A&R executives, and have composed, written, and produced music for gold and multi-platinum selling artists such as Big Pun, Nas, Raekwon, Prodigy of Mobb Deep, Mýa, Waka Flocka Flame, Jadakiss of The Lox, and others. Arkatech Beatz were also affiliated with Wu Tang Clan's American Cream Team as well as written and composed music for various movies such as the controversial 1999 drama film, Black and White, All The Women I’ve Loved, and others. Arkatech Beatz consists of members Mike "Trauma" D. and Jugrnaut.

Discography

Big Pun - Capital Punishment
 "Capital Punishment"

Big Pun - Yeeeah Baby
 "Leather Face"

Game - The Documentary (DVD)
 "Never Be Friends"

Terror Squad - The Album
 "Triple Threat" (Feat. Big Pun, Armageddon & Cuban Link)

Nas - The Lost Tapes (Japan Edition)
 "Worst Enemy"

Nas - Nas & Ill Will Records Presents QB's Finest
 "Kids In The PJs" (Feat. Bravehearts)
 "Self Conscience" (Feat. Prodigy)

Raekwon - Immobilarity
 "Intro" (Immobilarity)
 "Live From NY"
 "Casabalanca"
 "Jury" (Feat. Kim Stephens)
 "The Table" (Feat Masta Killa)

Raekwon - Whiteboys (soundtrack)
 "Respect Power"

Raekwon - Black and White (soundtrack)
 "It's Not A Game" (Feat. American Cream Team & RZA)

Lord Superb - Black and White (1999 drama film)
 "Superbs World"

Black and White (1999 drama film)

Raekwon - Unreleased
 "Black Harrison"
 "Rae Roc Realty
 "Vampire Bats"

Boot Camp Click - Duck Down Presents: The Album
 "Sleepers" (Feat. Illa Noyz & Rock)

Killarmy - Fear, Love & War
 "Nonchalantly"
 "Lady Sings The Blues" (Feat. Kim Stephens)

Obie Trice - Unreleased
 "What You Want"

Sean Baker
 "Passion Party"
 "I Love You"
 "Let's Dance"

Max B
 "Why You Do That"

Mýa - Sugar & Spice
 "Back To Disco"
 "Back To Disco" Remix (Feat. Yung Joc) (Unreleased)

Mýa - Untitled
 "Born A Star" (Unreleased)

Lil Scrappy - Tha Grustle (Unreleased)
 "Big Boi Talking"

Shawty Lo - I Am Carlos (Unreleased)
 "About My B.I" (Feat. Mýa)

Mýa - Beauty & the Streets Vol. 1
 Shawty Lo - "About My B.I" (Feat. Mýa)

Aasim
 "Paper Thin"

Spider Loc
 "My Block" (LAX)

Topic
 "Still Got A Ways 2 Go"

Shawty Lo
 "Let's Get It" Remix (Feat. DG Yola)

DG Yola
 "Get Money"(Got Doe) (Unreleased)

Triple C's
 "Murder Capital" (Feat. Torch & Young Breed)

Fabo - Untitled
 "You Ready" (Unreleased)
 "Highway"   (Unreleased)

FrontStreet of D4L
 "Straight Outta Bankhead" (Feat. Sean Baker)

DJ Holiday & Alley Boy - Definition of Fuck Shit
 "I'm Strapped"
 "Rapping & Robbing" (Feat. Princess of Crime Mob & Waka Flocka Flame)
 "50 Bars of Poison"
 "Get To It"

DJ Scream, Jon Geezy & Parlae - Blood Brothers
 "Blood Money"

DJ Scream - Heavy In The Streets 15
 Lil Hot - "H.I.T.S"

Alley Boy
 "Fuck You Too"

Supa Sport - Life In Da Fastlane
 "M.O.N.E.Y" (Feat. Meek Mill)

Slick Boy Ziggy - Intent 2 Distribute
 "Intent 2 Distribute"

DJ Greg Street & Eldorado Red - Jeffe Music: The G5 Edition
 "Shooters On Standby" (Feat. Alley Boy & Trouble)

DJ Swamp Izzo & Pesci - H.N.I.C
 "Speculation"

DJ Drama & Currensy - Verde Terrace
 "One For Da Wave"

All The Women I've Loved (2011 Film)

Freddie Gibbs - Cold Day In Hell
 "Let Ya Nuts Hang" (Feat. Scrilla)

DJ Swamp Izzo & Pesci - Duct Tape Land
 "Duct Tape Land"

Alley Boy- Nigganati
 "Ain't Loyal" (Feat. Trouble)

Blac Keef & Supa Sport - Contraband
 "Contraband"
 "Block Burner"

Eldorado Red - McRado's 2
 Bricks & Bails (Feat. A Mafia & Bambino Gold)

Blood Money Kartel - Alkkeda N Dekkatur
 Pesci "Never Ran"(Feat. Zone 6 & Killer Mike)

Sean Baker - This Love Shit Crazy
 Dawn
 Fuck or Fight
 This Love Shit Crazy
 Don't Leave Me Lonely (ft. Killer Mike)
 Troubles Away

Waka Flocka Flame - Triple F Life: Friends, Fans and Family
 "Power of My Pen"

MTV Made (TV series)
 Season 13 Episode 2

Arkatech Beatz - Arkatech Beatz Instrumentals Vol 1

Alley Boy - Gift Of Discernment
 "Tongue Powerful"

Cyhi the Prynce - Ivy League: Kick Back
 "Start A War"

Eldorado Red - White Power
 "Warfare" ft Trouble

Jadakiss - "Top 5 Dead or Alive"
 "Realest In The Game"(ft. Young Buck and Sheek Louch)

Arkatech Beatz - Theatre of War

References

External links
 
 Website
 

East Coast hip hop musicians
African-American record producers
American hip hop record producers
Living people
Record production duos
Musicians from New York City
Record producers from New York (state)
Year of birth missing (living people)
21st-century African-American people